The Telefomin roundleaf bat (Hipposideros corynophyllus) is a species of bat in the family Hipposideridae. It is found in West Papua (Indonesia)  and Papua New Guinea.

References

Hipposideros
Bats of Oceania
Mammals of Papua New Guinea
Mammals of Western New Guinea
Mammals described in 1985
Taxonomy articles created by Polbot
Bats of New Guinea